The twenty-sixth season of the American animated television series The Simpsons premiered on Fox in the United States on September 28, 2014, and concluded on May 17, 2015.

In this season, Krusty the Clown retires after his father dies ("Clown in the Dumps"); Homer and Bart attempt to solve some father/son conflicts ("The Wreck of the Relationship"); Marge opens a sandwich franchise ("Super Franchise Me"); the Simpsons meet their former (The Tracey Ullman Show) selves ("Treehouse of Horror XXV"); Mr. Burns finds a girlfriend in Democratic Assemblywoman Maxine Lombard ("Opposites A-Frack"); Bart schemes to bring down his new fourth grade teacher, Mr. Lassen (guest voice Willem Dafoe), who is a terrible bully ("Blazed and Confused"); Homer has a mid-life crisis ("Covercraft"); and the cast of Futurama make an appearance in Springfield in a crossover episode ("Simpsorama").

Additional guest voices for this season include Nick Offerman, David Hyde Pierce, Jeff Ross, and Matthew Sweet.

Episodes

References

Simpsons season 26
2014 American television seasons
2015 American television seasons